Steph and Dom's One Star to Five Star is a fly-on-the-wall British television documentary series that has been airing on Channel 4 since 9 October 2017.

References

External links
 
 

2017 British television series debuts
2010s British documentary television series
2010s British reality television series
Channel 4 documentary series
English-language television shows
Television shows set in England